Frederic Vystavel (born 29 August, 1993) is a Danish rower. He won a bronze medal at the 2020 Summer Olympics in the coxless pair.

References

External links
 Princeton Tigers bio

1993 births
Living people
Danish male rowers
Olympic rowers of Denmark
Princeton Tigers rowers
Rowers at the 2020 Summer Olympics
Medalists at the 2020 Summer Olympics
Olympic bronze medalists for Denmark
Olympic medalists in rowing